Dunaivtsi is a city in Kamianets-Podilskyi Raion, Khmelnytskyi Oblast  (province), Ukraine. It is located on the river Ternavka, 22 km away from the railway station Dunaivtsi and 68 km from the Khmelnytskyi. Reinforcement plant, repair and engineering works and butter-processing plant are located in the city. The city also houses a control center of the State Space Agency of Ukraine. Dunaivtsi hosts the administration of Dunaivtsi urban hromada, one of the hromadas of Ukraine. Current population is

History
The date of the first written mention in document about Dunaivtsi is 1403. This year is assumed to be the foundation date of the city. Almost two centuries later in 1577 King Sigismund III Vasa gave Dunaivtsi the city status and Magdeburg rights.

In 1793 - 1917 it was a town in the Podolsk Governorate of the Russian Empire.

Industrial peak of the town was on the 1870s, when 54 factories were working and close trade relations were between Dunaivtsi and Kyiv, Warsaw, Chişinău, Kharkov, Poltava, Kherson, Łódź, Yarmolyntsi.

The town was occupied by the Germans from July 1941 until last days of March 1944. During the occupation, the Germans carried out executions of the Jews. A witness interviewed by Yahad-In Unum described one of these executions, stating, "The Germans gathered 700 Jews of Demyankovtsy. They took them into the mine where the water rose until their knees. Afterwards, the entrance was exploded and Jews were suffocated inside."

Dunaivtsi has had city status in its modern form since 1958.

Until 18 July 2020, Dunaivtsi was the administrative center of Dunaivtsi Raion. The raion was abolished in July 2020 as part of the administrative reform of Ukraine, which reduced the number of raions of Khmelnytskyi Oblast to three. The area of Dunaivtsi Raion was merged into Kamianets-Podilskyi Raion.

Geography
The city is located almost in the geographic center of Dunaivtsi Raion on the Ternavka (a left tributary of the Dniester), 68 km away from the center of the Khmelnytskyi Oblast — the city Khmelnytskyi.

Geographical coordinates of the city are 48°53'22" (latitude) and 26°51'25" (longitude).

The total area of the city is 12.84 km² including 2.14 km² of the built-up area and 0.483 km² of the city's plantation. The total length of the streets, passages and embankments is 93.8 km.

Population
630 houses and about 3 thousand inhabitants were in Dunaivtsi in 1629. According to the census of 1909 the population of Dunaivtsi was 13 733 (8 966 Jews, 2 349 Eastern Orthodoxes, 1 266 Lutheran, 1 188 Catholic, 4 members of Armenian Apostolic Church). In [1911] more than 13 thousand people lived in Dunaivtsi, where 553 houses were in this year.

According to the census of 1989, Dunaivtsi's population was 17 482, and according to the census of 2001, 16 448 inhabitants were in Dunaivtsi.

According to more recent data provided by Khmelnytskyi Oblast Rada in 2006 population of Dunaivtsi city was 16 223, in 2007 — 16 187, in 2008 — 16 094, in 2009 — 16 140.

On January 1, 2010 it reached the peak of its historical population, with  20 724 inhabitants.

In January 2013 the population was 16,219 people.

Famous citizens
See also :Category:People from Dunaivtsi
 Bolesław Woytowicz, Polish pianist and composer
 Nykyfor Hryhoriv, paramilitary leader
 Frantz Lender, Soviet weapons designer
 Gennady Semigin, Russian politician
 Pavlo Hai-Nyzhnyk, Historian
 Wincenty Krasiński, Political activist and military leader
 Zygmunt Krasiński, Polish Romantic poet
 Mollie Steimer, Trade Unionist, Anti-war Activist and Free-Speech Campaigner

Economy 
Supermarket "Vopak" was open in Dunaivtsi on September 20, 2007.

Twin towns

Dunaivtsi has two twin towns — Turek and Brandýs nad Labem-Stará Boleslav. Cooperation of Dunaivtsi with Turek was established in 2000, while with Czech city — on May 10, 2010.

References

External links

 Registration form of city in the Ukrainian Parliament official website 
 Dunaivtsi website 

Cities in Khmelnytskyi Oblast
Cities of district significance in Ukraine
Ushitsky Uyezd
Shtetls
Holocaust locations in Ukraine